Gig Young (born Byron Elsworth Barr; November 4, 1913 – October 19, 1978) was an American stage, film, and television actor. He was nominated for the Academy Award for Best Supporting Actor for his performances in Come Fill the Cup (1952) and Teacher's Pet (1959), finally winning that award for They Shoot Horses, Don't They? (1969).

Early life
Born Byron Elsworth Barr in St. Cloud, Minnesota, he and his older siblings were raised by his parents, John and Emma Barr, in Washington, D.C. for a time. His father was a reformatory chef.  When Byron was six, his family moved to Waynesville, North Carolina, where he was raised. As a teenager, Byron returned to Washington and attended McKinley High School, where he developed his first love of acting appearing in school plays.

Career

Theatre
After graduating from high school he worked as a used car salesman and studied acting at night. He moved to Hollywood when a friend offered him a ride if he would pay for half the gas. After some amateur experience he applied for and received a scholarship to the acclaimed Pasadena Playhouse. "I had two jobs to support me, never rested, but it was great training and when I landed the part at Warner Bros., I was ready for it", he said.

Barr made early appearances in Misbehaving Husbands (1940), credited as "Byron Barr", and in the short Here Comes the Cavalry (1941).  While acting in Pancho, a south-of-the-border play by Lowell Barrington, he and the leading actor in the play, George Reeves, were spotted by a Warner Brothers talent scout. Both actors were signed to supporting player contracts with the studio.

Warner Bros. as Byron Barr
His early work was uncredited or as Byron Barr (not to be confused with another actor with the same name, Byron Barr) or Byron Fleming. It included appearances in Sergeant York (1941), Dive Bomber (1941), Navy Blues (1941), and One Foot in Heaven (1941). Barr had a bigger part in a short, The Tanks Are Coming (1941) which was nominated for an Oscar.

He was also in They Died with Their Boots On (1941) and You're in the Army Now (1941). He had an uncredited bit part in the 1942 Bette Davis film The Man Who Came to Dinner, saying, in his distinctive voice, "How's the ice?." He was also in Captains of the Clouds (1942), and The Male Animal (1942). Warners loaned him to Fox for The Mad Martindales (1942).

The Gay Sisters and becoming Gig Young
In 1942, six months into his Warner Brothers contract, he was given his first notable role in the feature film The Gay Sisters as a character named "Gig Young". Preview cards praised the actor "Gig Young" and the studio determined that "Gig Young" should become Barr's stage and professional name.  About the name change, Young later admitted to having "some hesitancy... but I weighed the disadvantages against the advantages of having it stick indelibly in the mind of audiences. There'd be no confusion with some other actor called Gig."  His parts began to get better: a co-pilot in Howard Hawks's Air Force (1943); and Bette Davis' love interest in Old Acquaintance (1943).

Young took a hiatus from his movie career and enlisted in the United States Coast Guard in 1941 where he served as a pharmacist's mate until the end of World War II, serving in a combat zone in the Pacific.  On Young's return from the war, he was cast as Errol Flynn's rival for Eleanor Parker in Escape Me Never (1947). The film was directed by Peter Godfrey who also helmed Young and Parker in The Woman in White (1948), after which he left Warners, unhappy with his salary.

Post-Warner Bros.
Young began freelancing at various studios, eventually obtaining a contract with Columbia Pictures before returning to freelancing. He came to be regarded as a popular and likable second lead, playing the brothers or friends of the principal characters.  In a 1966 interview he said, "Whenever you play a second lead and lose the girl, you have to make your part interesting yet not compete with the leading man. There are few great second leads in this business. It's easier to play a lead – you can do whatever you want. If I'm good it always means the leading man has been generous."

Young was Porthos in Metro-Goldwyn-Mayer's successful The Three Musketeers (1948). Then he supported John Wayne in Wake of the Red Witch (1948) at Republic Pictures and Glenn Ford in Columbia's Lust for Gold (1949).  Also at Columbia, he supported Rosalind Russell and Robert Cummings in Tell It to the Judge (1949).  Young had his first lead in a feature film at RKO in Hunt the Man Down (1951), a film noir. He went back to support roles for Target Unknown (1951) a war film at Universal; and Only the Valiant (1951), a Gregory Peck western.

Young began to appear in TV on shows such as The Silver Theatre, Pulitzer Prize Playhouse and The Bigelow Theatre.

Come Fill the Cup and first Oscar nomination
Young received critical acclaim for his dramatic work as an alcoholic in the 1951 film Come Fill the Cup with James Cagney, back at Warner Brothers. He was nominated for both an Oscar and Golden Globe for Best Supporting Actor. Young later gave Cagney a great deal of the credit for his performance.

Metro-Goldwyn-Mayer
Young supported Van Johnson in the MGM comedy Too Young to Kiss (1952). The studio liked Young so much that he was signed to a term contract. After supporting Peter Lawford in You for Me (1952), Young was promoted by MGM to leading man for Holiday for Sinners (1952). The film was a box office failure, however.  More popular was The Girl Who Had Everything (1953) where Young lost Elizabeth Taylor to Fernando Lamas.

MGM loaned Young to Republic Pictures for City That Never Sleeps (1953), where he had the starring role as a disillusioned cop. In 2008, Martin Scorsese selected this film to open a Republic Pictures retrospective that he curated at New York's Museum of Modern Art, citing the movie's amazing energy and creativity.  Back at MGM, Young had the lead in a 3-D Western, Arena (1953), which was a hit. He was a second male lead again – to Michael Wilding – in the Joan Crawford vehicle Torch Song (1953). Then he left MGM. "I played terrible parts there", he later said. He decided to relocate to New York.

Broadway
Young claims he rarely performed in comedies until he appeared on Broadway in Oh Men! Oh Women! (1953–54) which ran for 382 performances. Young recalled, "It was a big smash hit but never helped change my type in Hollywood for quite some time. I still played dull, serious parts like Errol Flynn's brother. Yet on Broadway, they offered me nothing but comedies."

During this time Young appeared on TV shows shot in New York such as Robert Montgomery Presents, Schlitz Playhouse, Producers' Showcase and Lux Video Theatre.

Return to Warner Bros.
When Oh Men! Oh, Women ended its run, Young went back to Warner Bros where he lost Doris Day to Frank Sinatra in Young at Heart (1955).  In 1955, Young became the host of Warner Bros. Presents, an umbrella title for three television mini-series (Casablanca, Kings Row, and Cheyenne) that aired during the 1955–1956 season on ABC Television.  He played a supporting role the same year in the Humphrey Bogart thriller The Desperate Hours.

Young is remembered by many James Dean fans for the "driving safety" interview made shortly before Dean's fatal car accident in September 1955. Dean wears a cowboy outfit as he was taking a break during shooting of the 1956 film Giant while playing with a lasso and counseling the audience to drive carefully.

After appearing on Broadway in Teahouse of the August Moon, Young returned to Hollywood to lose Katharine Hepburn to Spencer Tracy in Desk Set (1957). He continued to appear on TV in such shows as The United States Steel Hour, Climax!, Goodyear Theatre and Studio One in Hollywood (the latter starring Elizabeth Montgomery, whom he married in 1956).

Teacher's Pet and second Oscar nomination
George Seaton saw Young on Broadway and cast him as a tipsy but ultimately charming intellectual in Teacher's Pet (1958) starring Clark Gable and Doris Day. It earned Young a second Best Supporting Actor Oscar nomination.  Young was promptly reunited with Day in an MGM comedy, The Tunnel of Love (1958), though still the second male lead – after Richard Widmark. Also at MGM, he appeared with Shirley MacLaine and David Niven in Ask Any Girl (1959).  Young had a change of pace in a Clifford Odets drama, The Story on Page One (1959), although he was still second lead, to Anthony Franciosa.

On TV he appeared in a 1959 Twilight Zone episode titled "Walking Distance." He had some excellent parts – all male leads – in TV adaptations of The Philadelphia Story (1959), The Prince and the Pauper, Ninotchka (1960) and The Spiral Staircase (1961).  He guest-starred on The Alfred Hitchcock Hour and Kraft Suspense Theatre.

Young returned to Broadway with Under the Yum-Yum Tree (1960–61) which ran for 173 performances, originating the role later played by Jack Lemmon on film.  Some announced film projects fell through, so he instead played second lead in another another movie with Day, That Touch of Mink (1962), as Cary Grant's best friend. He was Elvis Presley's boxing promoter in Kid Galahad (1962), and lost Sophia Loren to Anthony Perkins in Five Miles to Midnight (1962). After supporting Kirk Douglas in For Love or Money (1963), he was given a rare male lead in MGM's A Ticklish Affair (1963), as Shirley Jones' love interest.

The Rogues

On the 1964–65 NBC TV series The Rogues, he shared appearances on a rotating basis with David Niven and Charles Boyer, although in practice Young helmed the greater number of episodes since Niven and Boyer were both busy with other film projects. The charming con man he played on that show was one of Young's favorite roles, and raised his profile with the television viewing public.  He later said, "I loved it, the public loved it, only NBC didn't love it."  Despite its popularity and critical acclaim, The Rogues was cancelled after one 30-episode season.  

During the filming of The Rogues, Young's alcoholism was starting to take a toll on his career; Larry Hagman had to be brought in as a substitute for the final two episodes.  After The Rogues ended, Young went on tour as Harold Hill in The Music Man, his first stage musical.  He supported Rock Hudson in the comedy Strange Bedfellows (1965), had the lead in a British horror film, The Shuttered Room (1967), and starred in a TV mystery movie, Companions in Nightmare (1968).  He enjoyed a successful return to Broadway in the hit comedy from Britain There's a Girl in My Soup (1967–68), which ran for 322 performances.

They Shoot Horses Don't They?
Young won the Academy Award for Best Supporting Actor for his role as Rocky, the alcoholic dance marathon emcee and promoter in the 1969 film They Shoot Horses, Don't They?. Young had not been the choice of director Sydney Pollack, but his casting was mandated by the head of ABC Pictures, Marty Baum, Young's former agent.  According to his fourth wife, Elaine Williams, "What he was aching for, as he walked up to collect his Oscar, was a role in his own movie—one that they could finally call 'a Gig Young movie.' For Young, the Oscar was literally the kiss of death, the end of the line."

Young himself had said to Louella Parsons, after failing to win in 1951, "so many people who have been nominated for an Oscar have had bad luck afterwards." However, when he finally won Young called the Oscar "the greatest moment of his life."

Young had a good part in the popular Lovers and Other Strangers (1970), also from ABC Pictures, and toured in Nobody Loves an Albatross (1970) in summer stock. He was in the TV movie The Neon Ceiling (1971), his performance earning him an Emmy nomination. A profile of Young around this time said "The well-established image of the boozy charmer Gig plays on and off camera fools you. That armour surrounds an intense dedicated artist, constantly involved with his profession."

Career decline
Young's worsening alcoholism began to cost him roles. Originally cast as The Waco Kid, Young collapsed on the set of the comedy film Blazing Saddles during his first day of shooting due to alcohol withdrawal, and was fired by director Mel Brooks. Brooks would replace him with Gene Wilder.  Young had a supporting role in Bring Me the Head of Alfredo Garcia (1974), directed by Sam Peckinpah, and was in a horror movie, A Black Ribbon for Deborah (1974). He was in the TV movies The Great Ice Rip-Off (1974) and The Turning Point of Jim Malloy (1975); Peckinpah used him again in The Killer Elite (1975).  In 1976, Aaron Spelling cast Young as the offscreen Charlie in his new action show Charlie's Angels. However, Young's alcoholism prevented him from performing the role, even only as a voice actor, and he was replaced at the last minute by John Forsythe.

Young was one of several names to star in The Hindenburg (1975). He guest-starred on McCloud, had a support role in Sherlock Holmes in New York (1976) and was a semi-regular in the TV series Gibbsville (1976–77), a spinoff from the TV movie The Turning Point of Jim Malloy.  His last role was in the 1978 revised version of Game of Death, which was released nearly six years after the film's original star, Bruce Lee, died during production in 1973.

Personal life
Young was married five times.  His first marriage to Sheila Stapler, a Pasadena Playhouse classmate, lasted seven years, ending in 1947. "We were too young, it couldn't have lasted", he later said. In 1950, he married Sophie Rosenstein, the resident drama coach at Paramount, who was several years Young's senior. She was soon diagnosed with cancer and died just short of two years after the couple's wedding.  For a time, he was engaged to actress Elaine Stritch.

Young met actress Elizabeth Montgomery after she appeared in an episode of Warner Bros. Presents in 1956, and the two married later that year. In 1963, Montgomery divorced Young because of his alcoholism.  Young married his fourth wife, real estate agent Elaine Williams, nine months after his divorce from Montgomery was final. Williams was pregnant with Young's child at the time and gave birth to his only child, Jennifer, in April 1964. After three years of marriage, the couple divorced. During a legal battle over child support with Williams, Young denied that Jennifer was his biological child. After five years of court battles, Young lost his case.

On September 27, 1978, Young, age 64, married his fifth wife, a 31-year-old German magazine editor named Kim Schmidt. He met Schmidt in Hong Kong while working on Game of Death.

Death
On October 19, 1978, three weeks after his marriage to Schmidt, the couple were found dead in their apartment at The Osborne in Manhattan. Police surmised that Young shot his wife and then himself. Young was found face down on the floor of his bedroom, a .38 caliber Smith & Wesson pistol in his hand. His wife was found face down beside him. Young had apparently shot himself in the mouth and the bullet exited the back of his head. His wife was shot in the back of the head. No suicide note was found.

A motive for the murder was never discovered. Police said there was a diary opened to September 27 with "we got married today" written on it. The couple appear to have died around 2:30 p.m., when shots were heard by a building employee, and their bodies were found five hours later. Young was at one time under the care of the psychologist and psychotherapist Eugene Landy, who later had his professional California medical license revoked amid accusations of ethical violations and misconduct with patients. Author Stephen King wrote the short story "1408" inspired by his stay in room 1402 at New York's Park Lane Hotel, which was misrepresented by the bellboy as the site of Young's murder/suicide.

Young's remains were taken to Beverly Hills for his funeral service, but he was later buried in the Green Hill Cemetery in Waynesville, North Carolina, under his birth name, Byron E. Barr, in his family's plot along with his parents, siblings and an uncle. Young's will, which covered a $200,000 estate, left his Academy Award to his agent, Martin Baum, and Baum's wife, Bernice. Young's daughter Jennifer launched a campaign in the early 1990s to get the award back from his agent, and struck an agreement that she would get the award back upon the agent's death, which occurred in 2010. For his contribution to the television industry, Young has a star on the Hollywood Walk of Fame at 6821 Hollywood Boulevard.

Filmography

Awards and nominations

References

External links

Gig Young at Turner Classic Movies

1913 births
1978 deaths
1978 suicides
20th-century American male actors
American male film actors
American male stage actors
American male television actors
American murderers
Best Supporting Actor Academy Award winners
Best Supporting Actor Golden Globe (film) winners
Male actors from Minnesota
Military personnel from Minnesota
Murder–suicides in New York City
People from St. Cloud, Minnesota
Suicides by firearm in New York City
United States Coast Guard non-commissioned officers
United States Coast Guard personnel of World War II
Warner Bros. contract players